Pacific University is a private university in Forest Grove, Oregon. The university maintains three other campuses in Eugene, Hillsboro, and Woodburn, and has an enrollment of more than 4,000 students.

History

Tabitha Moffatt Brown, a pioneer emigrant from Massachusetts, immigrated to the Oregon Country over the new Applegate Trail in 1846. After arriving, she and Harvey L. Clark started a school and orphanage in Forest Grove in 1847 to care for the orphans of Applegate Trail party. In March 1848, Tualatin Academy was established from the orphanage, with Clark donating  to the school. George H. Atkinson had advocated the founding of the school and with support of the Presbyterians and Congregationalists helped start the academy. Eliza Hart Spalding, part of the Whitman Mission, was its first teacher. Although the university has long been independent of its founding affiliation with the United Church of Christ (UCC), it still maintains a close working relationship with the church as a member of the United Church of Christ Council for Higher Education.

The academy was officially chartered by the territorial legislature on September 29, 1849. Clark was the first president of the board of trustees and later donated an additional  to the institution. In 1851, what is now Old College Hall was built and in 1853 Sidney H. Marsh became the school's first president. The current campus was deeded in 1851. In 1854, the institution became Pacific University. The first commencement occurred in 1863, with Harvey W. Scott as the only graduate. In 1872, three Japanese students, Hatstara Tamura, Kin Saito, and Yei Nosea, started at the university as part of Japan's modernization movement. All three graduated in 1876. Marsh died in 1879 and was replaced by John R. Herrick.

Marsh Hall was built in 1895, serving as the central building on Pacific's campus. Carnegie Library (now Carnegie Hall) opened in 1912 after Andrew Carnegie's foundation helped finance the brick structure. Portland architecture firm Whidden and Lewis designed the library. In 1915, the preparatory department, Tualatin Academy, closed due to the proliferation of public high schools in Oregon.

Marsh Hall was gutted by fire in 1975, but its shell was preserved, and the structure reopened in 1977. Phillip D. Creighton became Pacific's 16th president in 2003 and retired in 2009. Tommy Thayer, lead guitarist of the band KISS, was elected to the university's board of trustees in 2005. Pacific's 17th president, Lesley M. Hallick, was named on May 19, 2009.

Mascot
In 1896, alumnus J.E. Walker, who had been a missionary to China, and his mother gave the university a bronze Chinese statue. Qilin (pronounced chee-lin or ki-rin) is a mythical Chinese creature with a leonine stance, a unicorn-like horn, and deer or ox hooves from the Qing Dynasty. During this period, qilin were often represented with a dragon head, fish scales, ox hooves and a lion's tail. Said to be a good omen of wisdom and prosperity, the Pacific qilin was nicknamed Boxer by its Chinese and Japanese students as an embodiment of the community's cultural diversity.

In the first half of the 20th century, the original mascot was the center of informal "Boxer Toss" events, where different clubs and groups scrimmaged for the statue as a tradition of passing its care from one group to another. In 1968, Boxer became the university's official mascot, replacing Benny Badger. The next year, the statue disappeared, and only small pieces of have returned over the years. In the 1980s, the statue was recast as Boxer II; after supposedly enjoying an epic road trip across America, it too disappeared in the mid-2000s.

In 2006, the university commissioned a 12-foot tall sculpture to replace the missing Boxers, which now stands in a central park welcoming students to the residence halls. An alumnus returned parts of the original statue to the university in 2012. In 2018, alumni funded the design and casting of Boxer III by artist Pat Costello, unveiled during Homecoming weekend. Kept in trust as part of the university's art collection, the statue and exhibits on its cultural and community history are on display in the Tran Library.

Academics

Pacific is home to five colleges, offering undergraduate, graduate, and professional programs.

College of Arts & Sciences
Organized into 3 schools—Arts & Humanities, Natural Sciences, Social Sciences—the college offers over sixty undergraduate degree options, including unique options in Asia-Pacific studies, communication sciences & disorders, creative writing, editing and publishing, music therapy, outdoor leadership, nonprofit leadership, social work, and a suite of sustainability-centered art and science programs. The low-residency Masters of Fine Arts in Writing program, one of the earliest in the nation having begun in 2004, has been ranked by Poets & Writers magazine as one of the nation's top five low-residency MFA programs every year in which rankings were established. Pacific also opened a Master of Social Work program, based in Eugene, in 2014.

College of Business
One of the newest colleges, the College of Business (COB) was founded in 2013. It offers undergraduate degrees as well as the Master of Business Administration (MBA) at the Hillsboro campus. The college is accredited by the Accreditation Council for Business Schools and Programs (ACBSP).

College of Education
In 1994, the School of Education, now the College of Education, was established through reorganization of the professional teacher education programs that had been part of the College of Arts and Sciences. In 2004, the College of Health Professions was formed, now including four undergraduate programs and seven graduate programs.

College of Health Professions

Founded in 2006 (though several of its programs date back further), the College of Health Professions includes 13 different degree programs as well as a certification in gerontology. Most courses and clinics are on the Hillsboro campus, where the curricula focuses on interprofessional cooperation, and students gain practice in caring for underserved populations.

College of Optometry
The university's College of Optometry is one of the university's oldest colleges and one of 21 schools in the U.S. and Canada offering a doctorate in optometry. Pacific's program dates back to 1945, when it merged with the North Pacific College of Optometry. Pacific's College of Optometry also offers a master of vision science degree and operates eye clinic and eyeglass dispensaries in communities throughout the Portland area.

Campuses

Pacific University has four campuses across Oregon, in Forest Grove, Hillsboro, Eugene, and Woodburn. It also maintains satellite locations in Portland and Honolulu, Hawai'i. Pacific's Eugene campus is a single building that houses a portion of the College of Education; in 2013, Pacific opened a campus in Woodburn to provide further undergraduate and graduate programs in education.

Forest Grove
The Forest Grove campus features several historic buildings. Old College Hall is the oldest educational building west of the Mississippi and today serves as Pacific University's museum. Carnegie Hall, the university's first dedicated library building, was constructed in 1912 and today is home to the undergraduate psychology department. Marsh Hall, at the center of campus, houses several classrooms and faculty offices, in addition to administrative offices and a small auditorium. The Forest Grove campus opened a new residence hall, Cascade Hall, in 2014.

The Forest Grove campus is home to a number of sustainability initiatives in its infrastructure, earning a Silver Sustainability Tracking, Assessment & Rating System (STARS) rating in 2019. Several buildings have Leadership in Energy and Environmental Design (LEED) certification, including the Tim and Cathy Tran library, built in 2005 and remodeled with more study rooms and makers space in 2019. The LEED-certified Berglund Hall houses the College of Education and a community preschool, and Burlingham and Gilbert residence halls are LEED Gold-certified.

The Bill & Cathy Stoller Center is home to the university's intercollegiate athletic teams, athletic offices and the department of exercise science. It features more than 95,000 square feet of floor space, including team rooms, locker rooms, classrooms, a wood-floor gymnasium, a weight and fitness center and the Fieldhouse, the first indoor practice area in the Northwest Conference and the only one with FieldTurf. Outside the Stoller Center is the entrance to Hanson Stadium, which includes a FieldTurf soccer, lacrosse and football surface, a nine-lane track and grandstands. A new roof was built to cover the stadium grandstands in 2014. The stadium is part of the Lincoln Park Athletic Complex, built in 2008, which also houses the baseball complex, Chuck Bafaro Stadium at Bond Field, the softball complex, Sherman/Larkins Stadium, and natural grass fields for soccer and track throwing events, and is part of the City of Forest Grove's Lincoln Park, also home to a fitness trail, playground equipment, a BMX course, a skateboard park and picnic areas.

Hillsboro
The Hillsboro campus opened in 2006 with its first building, a five-story LEED Gold-certified building, which was dedicated as Creighton Hall. A second building, known as HPC2 and also LEED-certified, opened in 2010. The campus is part of the Hillsboro Health & Education District and is adjacent to the MAX light rail line. Primarily home to Pacific University's College of Health Professions, the campus houses several master's- and doctorate-level programs in health professions, as well as clinics, open to the public, for audiology, dental hygiene, physical therapy and professional psychology, as well as an interdisciplinary diabetes clinic and an eye clinic run by the Pacific University College of Optometry. The Virginia Garcia Memorial Health Center also has a clinic and pharmacy on site.

Eugene
The Eugene campus opened in 1992, offering undergraduate and graduate programs in the College of Education. In 2014, the College of Arts & Sciences added a master of social work (MSW) program to the site.

Woodburn
The Woodburn campus opened in 2012 to offer professional pathways in education with a focus on STEM (science, technology, engineering and mathematics) and teaching diverse students. The 5,000 square foot, 14-room Victorian home of Woodburn founder, nurseryman Jesse Settlemier, is the heart of two degree programs in education.

Portland
The MFA in Writing program maintains an office in Portland's Pearl District in the period between residencies—during winter held at Seaside, Oregon, and in the summer in Forest Grove. In addition, six locations of the optometry college-affiliated Pacific Eye Clinic and a mobile unit are dispersed across the Portland metro area.

Film location
Due to the year-round warm weather and Pacific Northwest greenery made famous in Twin Peaks, Stand By Me, The Goonies, and the Twilight films, Pacific is regularly used as a shooting location for television serials. With Forest Grove described as "a picture-perfect little town", works shot or set there include: 
 C.O.G. (2012)
 The Cops are Robbers (1990)
 In The Vault television series based on the Lovecraft short story (2018)
 The Librarians (2015–2017)
 Nowhere Man (1995–1996)
 Pretty Little Liars: The Perfectionists (2019)
 Zero Effect (1998)

Student life

Media
In part due to its proximity to the arts scene in Portland, the campus has a thriving writing and performance community.

Radio
 Boxer Radio: The Sound of Pacific

Publications
In addition to Pacific University Press and its two imprints founded in 2015, Tualatin Books and 1849 Editions, campus-based print publications include
 Heart of Oak, an annual yearbook (1894–)
 IJURCA: International Journal of Undergraduate Research & Creative Activities, a peer-reviewed, open-access research journal (2010–)
 The Pacific Index, the student newspaper (1893–)
 PLUM: Pacific's Literature by Undergraduate's Magazine and writing prizes (2007–)
 PU Stinker, a humor magazine (1948–1954)
 Silk Road Review: A Literary Crossroads, an internationally distributed literary magazine (2006–)

Greek life

All of the Greek societies at Pacific University are "local", meaning that they are unique to the campus.

Academic societies
ΨΧ - Psi Chi
ΣΤΔ - Sigma Tau Delta

Fraternities
ГΣ - Gamma Sigma (inactive)
ΑΖ - Alpha Zeta (inactive)
ΠΚΡ - Pi Kappa Rho

Sororities
ΑΚΔ - Alpha Kappa Delta
ΘΝΑ - Theta Nu Alpha
ΦΛΟ - Phi Lambda Omicron

Diaternities
ΔΧΔ - Delta Chi Delta

Athletics 
The Pacific Boxers are members of the Northwest Conference at the NCAA Division III level, having been one of the founding members of the conference in 1926. Pacific began playing football in 1894 as part of the Oregon Intercollegiate Football Association.

Today, men compete in baseball, basketball, cross country, football, golf, soccer, swimming, tennis, track and field, and wrestling. Women's programs include basketball, cross country, golf, lacrosse, rowing, softball, soccer, swimming, tennis, track and field, and wrestling.

Pacific's women's wrestling program is notable as one of the nation's first five varsity programs sponsored by a college. The team competed as part of the women's division of the National Collegiate Wrestling Association, which began competition in 2007.

One of the most decorated sports at Pacific is handball, begun in 1977 under English Professor Michael Steele. Since 1981, the Boxers have appeared in 39 consecutive collegiate national tournaments and captured numerous individual and team national championships. In 2019, the team added five more national titles to its record at the United States Handball Association National Collegiate Championships.

In addition to the amenities of the Stoller Center and Lincoln Park Athletic Complex, Pacific has indoor and outdoor tennis courts on campus and shares a competition-size pool with the City of Forest Grove.

Notable people

Faculty
Pacific's undergraduate faculty includes Jules Boykoff, a political scientist, poet, and activist focusing on the politics of the Olympic games. The MFA faculty has including award-winning writers such as Kwame Dawes, Tyehimba Jess, Dorianne Laux, Marvin Bell, Ellen Bass, and Garth Greenwell, among others. It has also included former professional basketball player Jeron Roberts.

Pacific University College of Optometry hired its first African American educator, Breanne McGhee, a full-time optometrist who practices in New Orleans. She works at the institution as an assistant professor and clinical adjunct.

Alumni
 Mark Hashem - Hawai'i State Representative Elect for House District 18
 Wlnsvey Campos '17 –  Oregon State Representative Elect for House District 28
Shirley Abbott '52, OD '53 – American ambassador, optometrist, and dairyman
 Les AuCoin '69 – U.S. Representative for Oregon's First Congressional District (1975–1992)
 Loren Cordain '74 – research scientist specializing in nutrition and exercise physiology
 Rick Dancer – journalist and politician
 Dick Daniels – former NFL player
 Daniel Gault (Tualatin Academy) – state legislator, educator, and journalist
 Alfred Carlton Gilbert 1902 (Tualatin Academy) – Olympian and inventor of the Erector Set
 Tim Hauck – former NFL player
 David G. Hebert '94 – musicologist, musician, and professor
 Lynn Hellerstein – optometrist, speaker, and author, best known for her work in the field of vision therapy
 William A. Hilliard '52 – journalist and editor of The Oregonian
 Augustus C. Kinney – longtime physician in Astoria, Oregon, and noted expert on tuberculosis at the turn of the 20th century
 Mike Kreidler '66, OD '69 – Washington state U.S. Representative and State Insurance Commissioner
 Gregg Lambert '83 – philosopher and literary theorist
 Olaus Murie 1912 – conservationist and mammalogist
 Tela O'Donnell '05 – Olympic wrestler
 Robert T. Oliver '32 – author, professor, and scholar, with over 50 books on Asian rhetorical traditions in the field of Intercultural Communication
 Carol Pott '86 – author, editor, and vocalist
 Harvey W. Scott 1863 – first graduate of Pacific, editor of The Oregonian
 Thomas H. Tongue 1868 – U.S. Representative for Oregon's First Congressional District
 Calvin Leroy Van Pelt '49 – World War II veteran
 Nancy Wilson (non-degree, '76) – lead guitarist and vocalist in the rock band Heart

See also 
 Melville Wilkinson
 Pacific University Press

References

Further reading
 en:Oregon Historical Quarterly/Volume 6/Origin of Pacific University by James Rood Robertson

External links

Official website
Official athletics website

 
Pharmacy schools in Oregon
1849 establishments in Oregon Territory
Educational institutions established in 1849
Universities and colleges in Portland, Oregon
Buildings and structures in Forest Grove, Oregon
Buildings and structures in Washington County, Oregon
Universities and colleges affiliated with the United Church of Christ
Universities and colleges accredited by the Northwest Commission on Colleges and Universities
Private universities and colleges in Oregon